is a Japanese international rugby union player who plays either as a fly-half or centre.   He currently plays for Suntory Sungoliath in Japan's domestic Top League.

Club career

Nakamura has played all of his senior club rugby in Japan with Suntory Sungoliath, which he joined in 2014.

International

Nakamura made his senior international debut for Japan in a match against the United Arab Emirates on May 10, 2013.   All of his other test match appearances have been against other Asian nations, with the exception of a cap earned as a substitute in a test against  in Tokyo in 2014.

References

1991 births
Living people
Japanese rugby union players
Japan international rugby union players
Rugby union fly-halves
Rugby union centres
Tokyo Sungoliath players
Sportspeople from Kagoshima Prefecture
Sunwolves players
21st-century Japanese people